Ramjibanpur is a city and a municipality in the Ghatal subdivision of the Paschim Medinipur district in the Indian state of West Bengal.

Geography

Location
It has an average elevation of 11 metres (36 feet).

Area overview
Ishwar Chandra Vidyasagar, scholar, social reformer and a key figure of the Bengal Renaissance, was born at Birsingha on 26 September 1820.

Ghatal subdivision, shown in the map alongside, has alluvial soils. Around 85% of the total cultivated area is cropped more than once. It has a density of population of 1,099 per km2, but being a small subdivision only a little over a fifth of the people in the district reside in this subdivision. 14.33% of the population lives in urban areas and 86.67% lives in the rural areas.

Note: The map alongside presents some of the notable locations in the subdivision. All places marked in the map are linked in the larger full screen map.

Demographics
As per 2011 Census of India, Ramjibanpur had a total population of 19,611 of which 10,030 (51%) were males and 9,581 (49%) were females. Population in the age range 0–6 years was 2,109. The total number of literate persons in Ramjibanpur was 14,735 (84.19% of the population over 6 years).

 India census, Ramjibanpur had a population of 17,363. Males constitute 51% of the population and females 49%. Ramjibanpur has an average literacy rate of 72%, higher than the national average of 59.5%: male literacy is 78%, and female literacy is 66%. In Ramjibanpur, 14% of the population is under 6 years of age.

Culture
David J. McCutchion mentions:
The Vishnu temple in Dayalbazar as a small flat roofed or chandni type, with terracotta decoration, built in 1833, measuring 14’ square’
The Radhakanta temple in Natunhat, in the same category as the Vishnu temple, with terracotta decoration, built in 1829, measuring 14’ 10” x 15’.
The Sridhara and Shiva temples (two attached temples), in the same category as the Vishnu temple, with extended façade for extra chambers, plain, measuring 24’ 3” x 3’.
 a pancha-ratna temple with ridged rekha turrets and porch on triple archway, of the standard West Bengal type with facades fully decorated.
 a pancha-ratna with ridged rekha turrets and single entrance with figures above the archway and around the façade.
a West Bengal nava-ratna, with terracotta decoration, now fallen to ruin.

Ramjibanpur picture gallery

References

External links

Cities and towns in Paschim Medinipur district
Cities in West Bengal